Action for Trans Health are a British advocacy group who campaign to improve access to transgender health care and to make it more democratic.

History 

In January 2017, the group co-organised a protest with No Prisons Manchester and Queer Agenda Sheffield outside of HM Prison Doncaster over the death of Jenny Swift, a trans woman who died while incarcerated in the prison. In September 2017, the group was involved in a counter-protest against an anti-trans group at Speakers' Corner in Hyde Park that sparked controversy after a brief fight broke out between one of the anti-trans demonstrators and one of the counter-protestors.

In May 2021, Dr Harriet Hutchinson, a community organiser with the group, gave evidence to a meeting of the Women and Equalities Select Committee for the committee's inquiry into Gender Recognition Act 2004 reform. Hutchinson provided the committee with evidence that trans people were often forced to "conform to stereotypes in order to receive a diagnosis" of gender dysphoria, and called for the NHS Gender Identity Clinic system to be abandoned in favour of an informed consent model.

Services 
The group maintains a list of trans-friendly GPs in the United Kingdom, crowdsourced from the trans community.

References

External links 
 

LGBT organisations in the United Kingdom
Transgender organisations in the United Kingdom
Advocacy groups in the United Kingdom
Transgender and medicine